Successor (March 27, 1964 – August 1, 1971) was an American Champion Thoroughbred racehorse.

Background
He was bred and raced by Gladys Phipps and her brother Ogden L. Mills under their Wheatley Stable banner. A full brother to Bold Lad, his sire was eight-time Leading sire in North America, Bold Ruler and his dam was the Champion racing mare, Misty Morn.

Racing career
Successor was the American Champion Two-Year-Old Colt of 1966. Among his wins, Successor defeated the previously unbeaten Dr. Fager by a length to earn a victory in the Champagne Stakes, recording the second fastest time in the race's history. On his final start of the year he won the Garden State Stakes on a sloppy track in November to confirm his position as the year's leading two-year-old.

Successor did not race again until March 13, 1967 when he ran out of the money in the Swift Stakes at Aqueduct Racetrack. Unplaced in the Blue Grass Stakes, Successor finished sixth to winner Proud Clarion in the Kentucky Derby. The colt went on to earn two seconds and two third-place finishes in major races that year and scored a popular win on October 18 in the 1 5/8 mile  Lawrence Realization Stakes.

Stud record
On February 17, 1968 Successor was sold for $1,050,000 to Hastings Harcourt's Flag Is Up Farms in Solvang, California. Retired to stud duty, Successor died prematurely after only a few years at age seven. Among his limited progeny, Right Honorable won the Del Mar Derby.

Pedigree

References

 Successor's pedigree and partial racing stats

1964 racehorse births
1971 racehorse deaths
Racehorses bred in Kentucky
Racehorses trained in the United States
American Champion racehorses
Thoroughbred family 5-f